Bahman Tahmasebi (born July 28, 1980) is a retired Iranian footballer who played as a striker.

Club career
Tahmasebi appeared in Irsotter where he moved to Esteghlal halfway through his first season, scoring few goals. He moved back to Fajr Sepasi and stayed for one season and moved to Paykan and stayed there for three seasons. He moved to Pegah and Fajr Sepasi, followed by Sepahan in summer 2008.

Club career statistics
Last Update  23 October 2013 

 Assist Goals

Honours

Club
Sepahan
Iran Pro League (1): 2009–10

Aluminium
Azadegan League runner-up (1):  2011–12

Individual
Azadegan League top scorer (1): 2011–12

External links
Persian League Profile

1980 births
Living people
Sportspeople from Mazandaran province
Iranian footballers
Association football forwards
Esteghlal F.C. players
Fajr Sepasi players
Paykan F.C. players
Naft Tehran F.C. players
Pegah Gilan players
Shahr Khodro F.C. players
Sepahan S.C. footballers
Persian Gulf Pro League players
Azadegan League players
People from Nowshahr